Hot Country Songs and Country Airplay are charts that rank the top-performing country music songs in the United States, published by Billboard magazine.  Hot Country Songs ranks songs based on digital downloads, streaming, and airplay not only from country stations but from stations of all formats, a methodology introduced in 2012. Country Airplay, which was published for the first time in 2012, is based solely on country radio airplay, a methodology which had previously been used for several decades for Hot Country Songs. In 2016, nine different songs topped the Hot Country Songs chart and 40 different songs topped Country Airplay in 52 issues of the magazine.

In the first issue of Billboard of the new year, Thomas Rhett was at number one on both charts with "Die a Happy Man". On Hot Country Songs, the song would continue to hold the top spot through the issue of Billboard dated March 19, finishing with a total of 17 weeks at number one. The song spent six consecutive weeks atop Country Airplay, twice as long as any other song in 2016. Additionally, it was the longest run at number one on Billboards airplay-based country chart since 2008.  The longest run at number one on the Hot Country Songs during the year was 18 weeks, achieved by the song "H.O.L.Y." by Florida Georgia Line. This figure was also the highest total number of weeks spent in the top spot by any act, as no act achieved more than one chart-topper during the year. On the airplay listing, ten acts reached the top spot with more than one song; Luke Bryan and Florida Georgia Line each achieved three number ones during the year. Rhett's total of seven weeks at number one was the highest for any act.

In the issue of Billboard dated October 8, the song "Forever Country", credited to Artists of Then, Now and Forever, achieved the rare feat of entering the chart at number one. The song, a one-off collaboration between 30 country stars from various eras released to mark the 50th Annual Country Music Association Awards, was only the third track to enter at the top spot in the history of the Hot Country Songs listing. A number of acts achieved their first number ones in 2016. Pop/rock singer P!nk gained a number one with her first song to appear on the country charts when she was featured on Kenny Chesney's song "Setting the World on Fire", which topped both charts. Six other acts gained their first number ones on the Country Airplay chart, beginning with Granger Smith, who topped the chart in February with "Backroad Song". Two female vocalists gained their first country number ones as featured vocalists on songs by more established male stars: Cassadee Pope with Chris Young on "Think of You", and Elle King with Dierks Bentley on "Different for Girls". The other first-time chart-toppers were Chris Lane with "Fix", Jon Pardi with "Head Over Boots", and the duo LoCash with "I Know Somebody". Additionally, Karen Fairchild made her first appearance at number one under her own name when she was featured on Luke Bryan's song "Home Alone Tonight", although she had previously reached the top spot as a member of the group Little Big Town. At the end of the year, Keith Urban's "Blue Ain't Your Color" was at number one on Hot Country Songs, and Brett Eldredge topped Country Airplay with "Wanna Be That Song".

Chart history

See also
2016 in music
List of artists who reached number one on the U.S. country chart
List of number-one country albums of 2016 (U.S.)
List of number-one country singles of 2016 (Canada)

References

2016
Number-one country singles
United States Country Singles